Charles William Copeland (12 March 1892 – 1939) was an English footballer who played in the Football League for Coventry City, Leeds City and Merthyr Town. In 1919 Copeland reported Leeds City to the FA for making illegal payments to guest players during World War I which would lead to the club being expelled by the Football League.

References

1892 births
1939 deaths
English footballers
Association football defenders
English Football League players
South Bank F.C. players
Leeds City F.C. players
Coventry City F.C. players
Merthyr Town F.C. players